The 2009 Shimadzu All Japan Indoor Tennis Championships was a professional tennis tournament played on indoor carpet courts. It was part of the 2009 ATP Challenger Tour. It took place in Kyoto, Japan between 9 and 15 March 2009.

Go Soeda (in singles) and Dieter Kindlmann / Martin Slanar (in doubles) were the defending champions. Soeda lost to Baptiste Dupuy in the first round of singles' competition. Kindlmann chose to not participate this year and Slanar partnered up with Aisam-ul-Haq Qureshi and they won in the final.

Singles main-draw entrants

Seeds

Rankings are as of March 2, 2009.

Other entrants
The following players received wildcards into the singles main draw:
  Ričardas Berankis
  Hiroki Moriya
  Gouichi Motomura
  Takao Suzuki

The following players received entry from the qualifying draw:
 Baptiste Dupuy
 Eric Nunez
 Tim Smyczek
 Toshihide Matsui

Champions

Men's singles

 Sergei Bubka def.  Takao Suzuki, 7–6(6), 6–4

Men's doubles

 Aisam-ul-Haq Qureshi /  Martin Slanar def.  Michael Kohlmann /  Philipp Marx, 6–7(7), 7–6(3), [10–6]

External links
Official website (in japanese)

Shimadzu All Japan Indoor Tennis Championships
All Japan Indoor Tennis Championships
2009 in Japanese tennis